Clarence Samuel Ross  (20 September 1880, Eldora, Iowa – 19 April 1975, Rockville, Maryland) was an American mineralogist, petrologist, and economic geologist. His 1961 paper on ash-flow tuffs, coauthored with Robert Leland Smith (1920–2016), has at least 600 citations.

Biography
Ross received from the University of Illinois his A.B in 1913, A.M. in 1915, and Ph.D. in 1920. He joined the U.S. Geological Survey in 1917. The survey first assigned him the task of mapping oil lands in Osage County, Oklahoma, where he studied bentonitic key horizons. In the summer of 1917 he was sent to the southern Appalachian region to study copper deposits
of the Ducktown type. In 1919, with Esper S. Larsen, Jr., he made geologic maps of the southern end of the San Luis Valley in New Mexico. In the early 1920s he published several reports with Hugh D. Miser.

Ross was a fellow of the Mineralogical Society of America, the Geological Society of America, and the American Geophysical Union. He was the President of the Mineralogical Society of American in 1935. He received the Roebling Medal in 1946. In 1927 William F. Foshag and Frank Lee Hess (1871–1955) named rossite in his honor. The secondary mineral which results from dehydration of rossite is named metarossite in his honor. Marjorie Hooker compiled a bibliography of Ross's papers.

On 2 November 1918, Ross married Helen Hall Frederick, who died in 1968. Their children were Betsy Ross Jones and Malcolm Ross, who became a geochemist with the U.S. Geological Survey.

Selected publications
 with Hugh Dinsmore Miser and Lloyd William Stephenson: 
 with Paul Francis Kerr: 
 
 
 with Sterling B. Hendricks: 
 with Roy A. Bailey and Robert L. Smith: 
 with Robert L. Smith and Roy A. Bailey:

References

1880 births
1975 deaths
20th-century American geologists
American mineralogists
Petrologists
Fellows of the Geological Society of America
Fellows of the American Geophysical Union
University of Illinois alumni
United States Geological Survey personnel
People from Eldora, Iowa